

Nathaniel James Merriman (4 April 1809 – 15 August 1882) was the third Bishop of Grahamstown from 1871 until his death.

He was educated at Winchester College and  Brasenose College, Oxford; and ordained in 1833. He was  curate then Vicar of Street, Somerset until he emigrated to South Africa. He rose to become Archdeacon of Grahamstown then Dean of Cape Town  before being elevated the Episcopate.

Conflict arose between Merriman, who was at this time the Bishop of Grahamstown and Frederick Williams, Dean of Grahamstown regarding the status of the Church of the Province of Southern Africa versus the Church of England and the validity of the appointments of bishops. Dean Williams then excluded Bishop Merriman from his Cathedral. This action resulted in many court cases which Williams won.

Family 
His son, John X. Merriman, was the last prime minister of the Cape Colony before the formation of the Union of South Africa in 1910. Frederick Merriman, the New Zealand politician was Nathaniel's brother.

He died on 15 August 1882 by being thrown from his carriage "with great violence"

Publications

Notes and references

External links 
 University of the Witwatersrand papers
 thePeerage.com
 Bibliographic directory from Project Canterbury

1809 births
People educated at Winchester College
Alumni of Brasenose College, Oxford
Anglican archdeacons in Africa
Deans of Cape Town
19th-century Anglican Church of Southern Africa bishops
Anglican bishops of Grahamstown
1882 deaths